Eric Van De Wiele (born 27 October 1952) is a former Belgian racing cyclist. He rode in four editions of the Tour de France between 1980 and 1983.

References

External links

1952 births
Living people
Belgian male cyclists
Sportspeople from Ghent
Cyclists from East Flanders